This is a list of the NCAA outdoor champions in the 4x440 yard relay until 1975, and the metric 4x400 meters relay being contested after metrication occurred in 1976.  Hand timing was used until 1973, starting in 1974 fully automatic timing was used.

Champions
Key
y=yards
A=Altitude assisted

4x440 yards relay

4x400 meters relay

References

GBR Athletics

External links
NCAA Division I men's outdoor track and field
Baylor media guide
UCLA Media guide 

NCAA Men's Division I Outdoor Track and Field Championships
4 × 400 metres relay
4x4 relay